PS Grimsby was a passenger and cargo vessel built for the Manchester, Sheffield and Lincolnshire Railway in 1888.

History

The ship was built by Earle's Shipbuilding of Hull and launched on 8 December 1888 by Miss J.M.C. Cook.  She was used on the New Holland to Hull ferry service.

In 1923 she transferred to the London and North Eastern Railway. She was scrapped in 1923.

References

1888 ships
Steamships of the United Kingdom
Paddle steamers of the United Kingdom
Ships built on the Humber
Ships of the Manchester, Sheffield and Lincolnshire Railway
Ships of the Great Central Railway
Ships of the London and North Eastern Railway